Atlantis Resort or Hotel may refer to:

Atlantis (Wisconsin Dells), in Wisconsin Dells, Wisconsin
Atlantis Casino Resort Spa, in Reno, Nevada
Atlantis Paradise Island, on Paradise Island in Nassau, Bahamas
Atlantis, The Palm, in Dubai, United Arab Emirates
Atlantis The Royal, Dubai
Atlantis Sanya, in China

See also 
 Atlantis (disambiguation)